Aareal Bank AG is an international company listed on the MDAX index with headquarters in Wiesbaden, Germany, which traded as DePfa Deutsche Bau- und Boden Bank AG and formed part of the DePfa Gruppe until 2002.

Aareal Bank is represented on three continents (Europe, North America and the Asia-Pacific region) and oversees property financing in more than 20 countries. Aareal Bank AG has been listed on the German stock exchange since 2002.

History
The company's history dates back to two institutions: Preußische Landespfandbriefanstalt (founded in 1922) and Deutsche Wohnstättenbank AG (founded in 1923), both of which were based in Berlin. Deutsche Wohnstättenbank AG was renamed Deutsche Bau- und Bodenbank in 1926.

In the years of the Nazi rule, the bank grew rapidly thanks to the bridging loan business which mainly targeted the funding of settlement and housing construction. These sectors boomed following the massive increase of the armament industry that demanded accommodation for their workers, often designed as National Socialist ideal settlements. The prospect of business opportunities due to the boom of the armament industry also fostered the bank's department for industrial loans. Millions of Reichsmark were granted to companies like Ruhrgas AG, Vereinigte Stahlwerke AG or Daimler-Benz AG. At the time of the Nazi seizure of power in 1933, already 63 of 267 employees belonged to the Nazi Party. While chairman of the supervisory board Otto Kämper was a member as well and publicly praised the success of the government in the field of housing, democrats such as Arnold Knoblauch or Eberhard Wildermuth, who was in contact with conspirators of the 20 July plot, were still holding a seat on the supervisory board until World War II.

Preußische Landespfandbriefanstalt was given the name Deutsche Pfandbriefanstalt in 1954. In 1979, Deutsche Pfandbriefanstalt acquired a majority interest in Deutsche Bau- und Bodenbank. It traded as public limited company under the name Deutsche Pfandbrief- und Hypothekenbank AG from 1989, before going public in 1991 and opening its first foreign branch in Amsterdam in the same year.

In 1999, Deutsche Pfandbrief- und Hypothekenbank AG was renamed DePfa Deutsche Pfandbrief Bank AG and transferred all property activities to Deutsche Bau- und Bodenbank, which was also given the name DePfa Bank AG BauBoden at this time. In 2002, the bank was divided into Aareal Bank AG (formerly Deutsche Bau- und Bodenbank), a property finance bank with headquarters in Wiesbaden, and DePfa BANK plc, a public finance bank based in Dublin. Since 2006, the company has focused on the Commercial Property Financing and Consulting/Services segments.

Bodies
Hermann J. Merkens has been chairman of the management board of the company since 2015. The supervisory board members are elected for a period of five years each. The current term of Marija Korsch as chairman of the supervisory board began in 2013.

Shareholder structure

(as of 31 December 2015)

Subsidiaries
The Aareal Bank Group includes the following companies:

See also

List of banks
List of banks in Germany

References

External links
Official website Aareal Bank AG
Official website Aareon AG
 
 

Banks established in 1922
Financial services companies of Germany
Banks of Germany
1922 establishments in Germany
Banks under direct supervision of the European Central Bank
Companies in the MDAX